The women's 10 kilometre pursuit at the 2007 Asian Winter Games was held on 30 January 2007 at Beida Lake Skiing Resort, China.

Schedule
All times are China Standard Time (UTC+08:00)

Results
Legend
DNS — Did not start

 Yelena Khrustaleva was awarded bronze because of no three-medal sweep per country rule.

References

Results

External links
Official website

Women pursuit